Hitra Wind Farm is a 24-turbine wind farm located in the municipality of Hitra in Trøndelag county, Norway and operated by Statkraft.

The farm was opened on 14 October 2004.

The Fosen Vind  wind farm complex will include the nearby Hitra 2 wind farm.

See also

 Fosen Vind

References

Hitra
Statkraft
Wind farms in Norway
2004 establishments in Norway